Megachile pseudonigra is a species of bee in the family Megachilidae. It was described by Mitchell in 1927.

References

Pseudonigra
Insects described in 1927